A flying ace, fighter ace or air ace is a military aviator credited with shooting down five or more enemy aircraft during aerial combat. The exact number of aerial victories required to officially qualify as an ace is varied, but is usually considered to be five or more.

The concept of the "ace" emerged in 1915 during World War I, at the same time as aerial dogfighting. It was a propaganda term intended to provide the home front with a cult of the hero in what was otherwise a war of attrition. The individual actions of aces were widely reported and the image was disseminated of the ace as a chivalrous knight reminiscent of a bygone era. For a brief early period when air-to-air combat was just being invented, the exceptionally skilled pilot could shape the battle in the skies. For most of the war, however, the image of the ace had little to do with the reality of air warfare, in which fighters fought in formation and air superiority depended heavily on the relative availability of resources.

The British initially used the term "star-turns" (a show business term).

The successes of such German ace pilots as Max Immelmann and Oswald Boelcke were much publicized, for the benefit of civilian morale, and the Pour le Mérite, Prussia's highest award for gallantry, became part of the uniform of a leading German ace. In the Luftstreitkräfte, the Pour le Mérite was nicknamed Der blaue Max/The Blue Max, after Max Immelmann, who was the first pilot to receive this award. Initially, German aviators had to destroy eight Allied aircraft to receive this medal. As the war progressed, the qualifications for Pour le Mérite were raised,  but successful German fighter pilots continued to be hailed as national heroes for the remainder of the war.

The few aces among combat aviators have historically accounted for the majority of air-to-air victories in military history.

History

World War I

World War I introduced the systematic use of true single-seat fighter aircraft, with enough speed and agility to catch and maintain contact with targets in the air, coupled with armament sufficiently powerful to destroy the targets. Aerial combat became a prominent feature with the Fokker Scourge, in the last half of 1915. This was also the beginning of a long-standing trend in warfare, showing statistically that approximately five percent of combat pilots account for the majority of air-to-air victories.

As the German fighter squadrons usually fought well within German lines, it was practicable to establish and maintain very strict guidelines for the official recognition of victory claims by German pilots. Shared victories were either credited to one of the pilots concerned or to the unit as a whole – the destruction of the aircraft had to be physically confirmed by locating its wreckage, or an independent witness to the destruction had to be found. Victories were also counted for aircraft forced down within German lines, as this usually resulted in the death or capture of the enemy aircrew.

Allied fighter pilots fought mostly in German-held airspace and were often not in a position to confirm that an apparently destroyed enemy aircraft had in fact crashed, so these victories were frequently claimed as "driven down", "forced to land", or "out of control" (called "probables" in later wars). These victories were usually included in a pilot's totals and in citations for decorations.

The British high command considered praise of fighter pilots to be detrimental to equally brave bomber and reconnaissance aircrew – so that the British air services did not publish official statistics on the successes of individuals. Nonetheless some pilots did become famous through press coverage, making the British system for the recognition of successful fighter pilots much more informal and somewhat inconsistent.  One pilot, Arthur Gould Lee, described his own score in a letter to his wife as "Eleven, five by me solo — the rest shared", adding that he was "miles from being an ace". This shows that his No. 46 Squadron RAF counted shared kills, but separately from "solo" ones—one of a number of factors that seems to have varied from unit to unit. Also evident is that Lee considered a higher figure than five kills to be necessary for "ace" status. Aviation historians credit him as an ace with two enemy aircraft destroyed and five driven down out of control, for a total of seven victories.

Other Allied countries, such as France and Italy, fell somewhere in between the very strict German approach and the relatively casual British one. They usually demanded independent witnessing of the destruction of an aircraft, making confirmation of victories scored in enemy territory very difficult. The Belgian crediting system sometimes included "out of control" to be counted as a victory.

The United States Army Air Service adopted French standards for evaluating victories, with two exceptions – during the summer of 1918, while flying under operational control of the British, the 17th Aero Squadron and the 148th Aero Squadron used British standards. American newsmen, in their correspondence to their papers, decided that five victories were the minimum needed to become an ace.

While "ace" status was generally won only by fighter pilots, bomber and reconnaissance crews on both sides also destroyed some enemy aircraft, typically in defending themselves from attack. The most notable example of a non-pilot ace in World War I is Charles George Gass with 39 accredited aerial victories.

Between the world wars

Between the two world wars, there were two theaters that produced flying aces, the Spanish Civil War and the Second Sino-Japanese War.

The Spanish ace Joaquín García Morato scored 40 victories for the Nationalists during the Spanish Civil War. Part of the outside intervention in the war was the supply of "volunteer" foreign pilots to both sides. Russian and American aces joined the Republican air force, while the Nationalists included Germans and Italians.

The Soviet Volunteer Group began operations in the Second Sino-Japanese War as early as December 2, 1937, resulting in 28 Soviet aces. The Flying Tigers were American military pilots recruited sub rosa to aid the Chinese Nationalists. They spent the summer and autumn of 1941 in transit to China, and did not begin flying combat missions until December 20, 1941.

World War II

Some U.S. commands also credited aircraft destroyed on the ground as equal to aerial victories. The Soviets distinguished between solo and group kills, as did the Japanese, though the Imperial Japanese Navy stopped crediting individual victories (in favor of squadron tallies) in 1943.
The Soviet Air Forces has the top Allied pilots in terms of aerial victories, Ivan Kozhedub credited with 66 victories and Alexander Pokryshkin scored 65 victories. It also claimed the only female aces of the war: Lydia Litvyak scored 12 victories and Yekaterina Budanova achieved 11. The highest scoring pilots from the Western allies against the German Luftwaffe were Johnnie Johnson (RAF, 38 kills) and Gabby Gabreski (USAAF, 28 kills in the air and 3 on the ground). In the Pacific theater Richard Bong became the top American fighter ace with 40 kills. In the Mediterranean theater Pat Pattle achieved at least 40 kills, mainly against Italian planes, and became the top fighter ace of the British Commonwealth in the war. Fighting on different sides, the French pilot Pierre Le Gloan had the unusual distinction of shooting down four German, seven Italian and seven British aircraft, the latter while he was flying for Vichy France in Syria.

The German Luftwaffe continued the tradition of "one pilot, one kill", and now referred to top scorers as Experten. Some Luftwaffe pilots achieved very high scores, such as Erich Hartmann (352 kills) or Gerhard Barkhorn (301 kills). There were 107 German pilots with more than 100 kills. Most of these were won against the Soviet Air Force. The highest scoring fighter ace against Western allied forces were Hans-Joachim Marseille (158 kills) and Heinz Bär (208 kills, of which 124 in the west). Notable are also Heinz-Wolfgang Schnaufer, with 121 kills the highest-scoring night-fighter ace, and Werner Mölders, the first pilot to claim more than 100 kills in the history of aerial warfare. Pilots of other Axis powers also achieved high scores, such as Ilmari Juutilainen (Finnish Air Force, 94 kills), Constantin Cantacuzino (Romanian Air Force, 69 kills) or Mato Dukovac (Croatian Air Force, 44 kills). The highest scoring Japanese fighter pilot was Tetsuzō Iwamoto, who achieved 216 kills. 

A number of factors probably contributed to the very high totals of the top German aces. For a limited period (especially during Operation Barbarossa), many Axis victories were over obsolescent aircraft and either poorly trained or inexperienced Allied pilots. In addition, Luftwaffe pilots generally flew many more individual sorties (sometimes well over 1000) than their Allied counterparts. Moreover, they often kept flying combat missions until they were captured, incapacitated, or killed, while successful Allied pilots were usually either promoted to positions involving less combat flying or routinely rotated back to training bases to pass their valuable combat knowledge to younger pilots. An imbalance in the number of targets available also contributed to the apparently lower numbers on the Allied side, since the number of operational Luftwaffe fighters was normally well below 1,500, with the total aircraft number never exceeding 5,000, and the total aircraft production of the Allies being nearly triple that of the other side. A difference in tactics might have been a factor as well; Erich Hartmann, for example, stated "See if there is a straggler or an uncertain pilot among the enemy... Shoot him down.", which would have been an efficient and relatively low-risk way of increasing the number of kills. At the same time, the Soviet 1943 "Instruction For Air Combat" stated that the first priority must be the enemy commander, which was a much riskier task, but one giving the highest return in case of a success.

Post-World War II aces

Korean War

The Korean War of 1950–53 marked the transition from piston-engined propeller driven aircraft to more modern jet aircraft. As such, it saw the world's first jet-vs-jet aces. The highest scoring ace of the war is considered to be the Soviet pilot Nikolai Sutyagin who claimed 22 kills.

Vietnam War

The Vietnam People's Air Force had begun development of its modern air-forces, primarily trained by Czechoslovak and Soviet trainers since 1956. The outbreak of the largest sustained bombardment campaign in history prompted rapid deployment of the nascent air-force, and the first engagement of the war was in April 1965 at Thanh Hóa Bridge which saw relatively outdated subsonic MiG-17 units thrown against technically superior F-105 Thunderchief and F-8 Crusader, damaging 1 F-8 and killing two F-105 jets. The MiG-17 generally did not have sophisticated radars and missiles and relied on dog-fighting and manoeuvrability to score kills on US aircraft. Since US aircraft heavily outnumbered North Vietnamese ones, the Warsaw Pact and others had begun arming North Vietnam with MiG-21 jets. The VPAF had adopted an interesting strategy of "guerrilla  warfare in the sky" utilising quick hit-and-run attacks against US targets, continually flying low and forcing faster, more heavily armed US jets to engage in dog-fighting where the MiG-17 and MiG-21 had superior manoeuvrability.  The VPAF had carried out the first air-raid on US ships since WW2, with two aces including Nguyễn Văn Bảy attacking US ships during the Battle of Đồng Hới in 1972. Quite often air-to-air losses of US fighter jets were re-attributed to surface-to-air missiles, as it was considered "less embarrassing". By the war's end, the US had nevertheless confirmed 249 air-to-air US aircraft losses while the figures for North Vietnam are disputed, ranging from 195 North Vietnamese aircraft from US claims to 131 from Soviet, North Vietnamese and allied records.

American air-to-air combat during the Vietnam War generally matched intruding United States fighter-bombers against radar-directed integrated North Vietnamese air defense systems. American  F-4 Phantom II, F-8 Crusader and F-105 fighter crews usually had to contend with surface-to-air missiles, anti-aircraft artillery, and machine gun fire before opposing fighters attacked them.  The long-running conflict produced 22 aces: 17 North Vietnamese pilots, two American pilots, three American weapon systems officers or WSOs (WSO is the USAF designation, one of the three was actually a US Naval aviator, with an equivalent job, but using the USN designation of Radar Intercept Officer or RIO).

Arab–Israeli war

The series of wars and conflicts between Israel and its neighbors began with Israeli independence in 1948 and continued for over three decades.

Iran–Iraq war

Brig. General Jalil Zandi (1951–2001) was an ace fighter pilot in the Islamic Republic of Iran Air Force, serving for the full duration of the Iran–Iraq War. His record of eight confirmed and three probable victories against Iraqi combat aircraft qualifies him as an ace and the most successful pilot of that conflict and the most successful Grumman F-14 Tomcat pilot worldwide.

Brig. General Shahram Rostami was another Iranian ace. He was also an F-14 pilot. He had six confirmed kills. His victories include one MiG-21, two MiG-25s, and three Mirage F1s.

Colonel Mohammed Rayyan  was also another ace fighter pilot who shot down 5 to 8 Iranian aircraft, mostly F-4 Phantoms during the war.

Indo-Pakistan War 
Air Commodore Muhammad Mahmood Alam was an ace fighter pilot in the Pakistan Air Force.
During the Indo-Pakistani War of 1965, Alam downed five aircraft in a single sortie on 7 September 1965 with four in less than a minute, establishing a world record. These claims, however, have been widely contested by Indian Air Force officials.

Russo-Ukrainian War
On 13 October 2022, the Ukrainian government claims that Ukrainian pilot Vadym Voroshylov shot down 5 Shahed 136 drones before being forced to eject from his MiG-29 aircraft after it was hit by debris from the last Shahed-136 that had shot down. Voroshylov had shot down two Russian cruise missiles the day prior.

Accuracy

Realistic assessment of enemy casualties is important for intelligence purposes, so most air forces expend considerable effort to ensure accuracy in victory claims. In World War II, the aircraft gun camera came into general usage by the Luftwaffe as well as the RAF and USAAF, partly in hope of alleviating inaccurate victory claims.

In World War I the standards for confirmation of aerial victories were developed. The most strict were the German and French ones which required both the existence of traceable wrecks or observations of independent observers. In contrast to this, the British system also accepted single claims of the pilots and deeds such as enemy planes "out of control", "driven down" and "forced to land". Aerial victories were also divided among different pilots. This led to vast overclaims on the British and partially on the US American side. Some air forces, such as the USAAF, also included kills on the ground as victories.

The most accurate figures usually belong to the air arm fighting over its own territory, where many wrecks can be located, and even identified, and where shot down enemy are either killed or captured. It is for this reason that at least 76 of the 80 aircraft credited to Manfred von Richthofen can be tied to known British losses—the German Jagdstaffeln flew defensively, on their own side of the lines, in part due to General Hugh Trenchard's policy of offensive patrol.

In World War II overclaims were a common problem. Nearly 50% of RAF victories in the Battle of Britain, for instance, do not tally statistically with recorded German losses—but some at least of this apparent over-claiming can be tallied with known wrecks, and aircrew known to have been in British PoW camps. An overclaim of about 2-3 was common on all sides, and Soviet overclaims were sometimes higher. The claims of the Luftwaffe pilots are considered as mostly reasonable and more accurate than those according to the British and American system. 

To quote an extreme example, in the Korean War, both the U.S. and Communist air arms claimed a 10-to-1 victory/loss ratio.

Non-pilot aces

While aces are generally thought of exclusively as fighter pilots, some have accorded this status to gunners on bombers or reconnaissance aircraft, observers in two-seater fighters such as the early Bristol F.2b, and navigators/weapons officers in jet aircraft such as the McDonnell Douglas F-4 Phantom II. Because pilots often teamed with different air crew members, an observer or gunner might be an ace while his pilot is not, or vice versa. Observer aces constitute a sizable minority in many lists. 

In World War I, the observer Gottfried Ehmann of the German Luftstreitkräfte was credited with 12 kills, for which he was awarded the Golden Military Merit Cross. In the Royal Flying Corps the observer Charles George Gass tallied 39 victories, of which 5 were actually confirmed. The spread was caused by the lavish British system of aerial victory confirmation.

In World War II, United States Army Air Forces S/Sgt. Michael Arooth, a Boeing B-17 Flying Fortress tail gunner serving in the 379th Bombardment Group, was credited with 19 kills and the Consolidated B-24 Liberator gunner Arthur J. Benko (374th Bombardment Squadron) with 16 kills. The Royal Air Force's leading bomber gunner, Wallace McIntosh, was credited with eight kills while serving as a rear turret gunner on Avro Lancasters, including three on one mission. Flight Sergeant F. J. Barker contributed to 12 victories while flying as a gunner in a Boulton Paul Defiant turret-equipped fighter piloted by Flight Sergeant E. R. Thorne. On the German side, Erwin Hentschel, the Junkers Ju 87 rear gunner of Luftwaffe pilot and anti-tank ace Hans-Ulrich Rudel, had 7 confirmed kills. The crew of the bomber pilot Otto Köhnke from Kampfgeschwader 3 is credited with the destruction of 11 enemy fighters (6 French, 1 British, 4 Soviet).

With the advent of more advanced technology, a third category of ace appeared. Charles B. DeBellevue became not only the first U.S. Air Force weapon systems officer (WSO) to become an ace but also the top American ace of the Vietnam War, with six victories. Close behind with five were fellow WSO Jeffrey Feinstein and Radar Intercept Officer William P. Driscoll.

Ace in a day

The first military aviators to score five or more victories on the same date, thus each becoming an "ace in a day", were pilot Julius Arigi and observer/gunner Johann Lasi of the Austro-Hungarian air force, on August 22, 1916, when they downed five Italian aircraft. The feat was repeated five more times during World War I.

Becoming an ace in a day became relatively common during World War II.  A total of 68 U.S. pilots (43 Army Air Forces, 18 Navy, and seven Marine Corps pilots) were credited with the feat, including legendary test pilot Chuck Yeager.

In the Soviet offensive of 1944 in the Karelian Isthmus, Finnish pilot Hans Wind shot down 30 enemy aircraft in 12 days.  In doing so, he obtained "ace in a day" status three times.

During the Indo-Pakistani War of 1965, Pakistani pilot Muhammad Mahmood Alam downed five aircraft in a single sortie on 7 September 1965 with four in less than a minute, establishing a world record. These claims, however, as always have been widely contested by Indian Air Force.

See also
 Fighter aircraft
 Iraqi aerial victories during the Iran–Iraq war
 Light fighter
 List of aces of aces
 List of Egyptian flying aces
 List of German World War II jet aces
 List of Iranian aerial victories during the Iran–Iraq war
 List of Israeli flying aces
 List of Korean War flying aces
 List of Spanish Civil War flying aces
 List of Syrian flying aces
 List of Vietnam War flying aces
 List of World War I flying aces
 List of World War II aces by country
 List of World War II flying aces
 Lists of flying aces in Arab–Israeli wars

Notes

References

Bibliography

 Belich, Jamie. "Ace, air combat". Richard Holmes, Charles Singleton and Spencer Jones, eds. The Oxford Companion to Military History. Oxford University Press, 2001 [online 2004].
 Bergström, Christer. Barbarossa: The Air Battle, July–December 1941. Birmingham, UK: Classic Publications, 2007. .
 Dunnigan, James F. How to Make War: A Comprehensive Guide to Modern Warfare in the Twenty-first Century. New York: HarperCollins, 2003. .
 Farr, Finis. Rickenbacker's Luck: An American Life. New York: Houghton Mifflin, 1979. .
 Franks, Norman and Frank W. Bailey. Over the Front: A Complete Record of the Fighter Aces and Units of the United States and French Air Services, 1914–1918. London: Grub Street, 1992. .
 Franks, Norman, Frank W. Bailey and Russell Guest. Above the Lines: The Aces and Fighter Units of the German Air Service, Naval Air Service and Flanders Marine Corps, 1914–1918. London: Grub Street, 1993. .
 .
 Galland, Adolf The First and the Last London, Methuen, 1955 (Die Ersten und die Letzten Germany, Franz Schneekluth, 1953).
 
 Guttman, Jon. Pusher Aces of World War 1. London: Osprey, 2009. .
 Hobson, Chris. Vietnam Air Losses, USAF, USN, USMC, Fixed-Wing Aircraft Losses in Southeast Asia 1961–1973. North Branch, Minnesota: Specialty Press, 2001. .
 Johnson, J. E. Wing Leader. London: Ballantine, 1967.
 Lake, John. The Battle of Britain. London: Amber Books, 2000. .
 Lee, Arthur Gould. No Parachute. London: Jarrolds, 1968.
 O'Connor, Martin. Air Aces of the Austro-Hungarian Empire 1914–1918. Boulder, Colorado: Flying Machine Press, 1986. .
 Pieters, Walter M. Above Flanders' Fields: A Complete Record of the Belgian Fighter Pilots and Their Units During the Great War, 1914–1918. London: Grub Street, 1998. .
 Robertson, Linda R. (2005). The Dream of Civilized Warfare: World War I Flying Aces and the American Imagination . University of Minnesota Press. , 
 Robinson, Bruce (ed.) von Richthofen and the Flying Circus. Letchworth, UK: Harleyford, 1958.
 Shores, Christopher. Air Aces. Greenwich Connecticut: Bison Books, 1983. 
 .
 Stenman, Kari and Kalevi Keskinen. Finnish Aces of World War 2 (Osprey Aircraft of the Aces, number 23). London: Osprey Publishing. 1998. .
 Thomas, Andrew. Defiant, Blenheim and Havoc Aces. London: Osprey Publishing, 2012. .
 Toliver, Raymond J. and Trevor J. Constable. Horrido!: Fighter Aces of the Luftwaffe. London: Bantam Books, 1979. .
 Toperczer, Istvan. MIG-17 and MIG-19 Units of the Vietnam War (Osprey Combat Aircraft, number 25). London: Osprey, 2001. .
 .

External links

 Air Aces Homepage  (A.Magnus)
 Air Aces Website  (Jan Šafařík)
 Air Combat Information Group Website
 All aces of Korean air war

 
Flying aces